Stefania oculosa (common name in ) is a species of frog in the family Hemiphractidae. It is endemic to the Bolívar state of southern Venezuela and only known from Cerro Jaua, a tepui; it possibly occurs more widely. It was found on rocks in a fast-flowing cascading stream where it co-occurred with Stefania percristata. The known range is within the Jaua-Sarisariñama National Park, and the species is not facing known threats.

References

oculosa
Amphibians of Venezuela
Endemic fauna of Venezuela
Taxa named by Josefa Celsa Señaris
Amphibians described in 1997
Taxonomy articles created by Polbot
Amphibians of the Tepuis